Ray Ellin is an American comedian, talk show host, producer, writer, and director.

Career
Ellin performs at top comedy clubs around the United States. He hosted and wrote for the syndicated shows The Movie Loft, Premium TV, New York Now, and BrainFuel TV. He also hosts the ground-breaking web-based talk show LateNet with Ray Ellin. The show has had appearances by comedians, actors, and authors including Chevy Chase, Leonard Nimoy, Jeff Garlin, Hank Azaria, Charles Grodin, Richard Belzer, Susie Essman, Artie Lange, Amy Sedaris, Richard Kind, Paul Shaffer, Oksana Baiul and Fran Drescher.

Ellin produced and directed the film The Latin Legends Of Comedy, which he financed on his own six credit cards. Its opening weekend, the film finished third in per-screen average behind Oscar winners The Last King Of Scotland and The Queen. The movie was acquired by 20th Century Fox for US DVD rights. Ellin co-starred in the film Killing Cinderella opposite Jessica Capshaw. In 2011, Ellin became the host of the Gong Show Live, a resurrection of the iconic television show. In 2012, he became the host of the new television show Worth The Wait.

In 2013, Ellin opened Aruba Ray's Comedy Club on the island of Aruba. The venue recently celebrated its five-year anniversary, and does approximately 100 shows a year, and features top US comedians on each show (including Ellin). The wildly successful venue is rated number one on TripAdvisor in three different categories, including Best Show, Best Nightlife, and Best Fun and Games. Ellin has become an outspoken ambassador of Aruba, and once declared on an interview on Fox television that "Aruba saved him spiritually."

In 2018, Ellin became executive producer of the television show This Week at the Comedy Cellar. The show was sold to Comedy Central, and wrapped season three in early 2020.

In May 2020, Ellin started Comedy Cloud, a company that produces live, interactive, online comedy shows for companies, non-profits, and schools.

Personal

Ellin grew up with older sisters, who had him listening to Barry Manilow songs as a small boy. Therefore, he knows the lyrics to almost all of Manilow's songs. At age eleven, would get up at 5:30 a.m. to deliver The Boston Globe. Ellin moved to New York City after college. He moved around many times, at one point sleeping in the front seat of his Dodge Aspen. While parked in front of a Manhattan high school, Ellin was awoken by students rocking the car. He has had a variety of jobs, including selling postal uniforms to letter carriers. Ellin has joked "You've never lived until you've measured the inseam of an angry mailman."

Ellin has been featured regularly in the "Page 6" column of the New York Post and other media outlets. 

Ellin has helped raise over a million dollars for various charities; he has been quoted as saying "I want to make a fortune doing what I love to do, and then just be a philanthropist."

Awards
 2009: Ellin was named one of "New York's Best Emerging Artists".
 2006: Ellin received a Proclamation from the City of New York for his contributions to comedy.
 His film The Latin Legends Of Comedy won the jury award at the Boston International Film Festival.

External links
Official Website

Official Website

References

American stand-up comedians
Living people
21st-century American comedians
Year of birth missing (living people)